Sunbeam, a British luxury yacht launched in 1874, became famous when Annie Brassey, the wife of its owner Thomas Brassey, published a book describing their adventures during a world cruise.  The book, titled A Voyage in the Sunbeam, our Home on the Ocean for Eleven Months, became a best seller and was translated into many languages.

Yacht  Details 
Sunbeam was built for Thomas Brassey by Bowdler & Chaffer of Seacombe, from a design by St Clare Byrne.  She was a three-masted topsail-yard schooner, iron framed and with teak skin.  Length 159 ft, beam 27.5 ft, weight 532 tons.  The sail area was 9,000 square yards.  The yacht had an auxiliary compound steam engine of 70 hp that developed a top speed of just over 10 knots.  The bunkers could hold eighty tons of coal and although primarily a sailing vessel, she could steam for approximately 20 days without refuelling.  When not in steam, the funnel would be lowered and the propeller feathered to reduce drag.  Unlike many of the luxury yachts of the time, Sunbeam had been designed for long distance and deep sea journeys.   The accommodation for the owners and their guests, however, was far from Spartan, with rooms fashioned in a typical Victorian drawing-room style.
   
The name Sunbeam came from the nickname they had given to their daughter - Constantine Alberta Brassey - who had died in 1873 from scarlet fever.

Annie Brassey’s books

Annie Brassey had previously written, and privately printed, travel stories for her friends and family.  After returning from their 1876-77 world cruise in Sunbeam, she wrote a book about their adventures and published this with Longmans & Co.  It was titled: “A Voyage in the Sunbeam, our Home on the Ocean for Eleven Months” and became a best seller, later translated for sales overseas with equal success.  Their journey had started at Chatham on 1 July 1876 with a complement of 43 including their four children, friends, servants and crew.  They headed for Rio de Janeiro via Madeira, Tenerife, and Cape Verde.  From there to Montevideo, Buenos Aires and Punta Arenas, rescuing the crew from a sinking ship on the way.   Once through the Straits of Magellan they headed north to Lota in Chile.  Leaving Valparaiso on 31 October, they made a brief stop at the small island of Hao Harpe before visiting Tahiti, and a week later headed for Hawaii, then Japan, Hong Kong, Canton, Macao and Singapore.  From there to Seychelles, Maldives, India, Sri Lanka, Aden and, via the Suez Canal, to Alexandria before heading to Malta, Gibraltar and Portugal, arriving back home in Hastings on 26 May 1877 having travelled some 36,000 miles.

Within a few years other yachts followed in the wake of Sunbeam, two notables being Wanderer  and Lancashire Witch.

Annie wrote further books about voyages on the Sunbeam including: Sunshine and Storms in the East, or Cruises to Cyprus and Constantinople (1880); In the Trade, the Tropics and the Roaring Forties (1884); and The Last Voyage to India and Australia in the Sunbeam  which was published posthumously in 1887.  She had died on board the Sunbeam during a return trip from Australia and was buried at sea.

Sunbeam’s career
In addition to the voyages detailed in Annie Brassey's books, Sunbeam sailed in home water for many years including cruises around the Irish and Scottish coasts.  During a voyage from Middlesbrough to Portsmouth on 14 October 1881, Sunbeam was struck by a hurricane as the barometer dropped to 28.45.  Thomas Brassey later said that this was the only time he had seen her in trouble, as she healed over so far that her gig and lighter boats were smashed and carried away.

In 1885 Mr William Gladstone, who had recently resigned as Prime Minister, was a guest of the Brasseys on Sunbeam for a 3-week cruise to Scandinavia.  Annie Brassey contributed an article to Contemporary Review describing the trip.  Alfred, Lord Tennyson was also a guest on Sunbeam in 1889 for a cruise in home waters.

In 1895 Thomas Brassey (now Earl Brassey and remarried) was appointed Governor of Victoria in Australia.   Brassey, who had a yacht master's certificate, skippered Sunbeam via Cape Horn to Melbourne.  Whilst in Australia, Sunbeam visited Sydney, Adelaide, Brisbane, Tasmania and in 1896-97 New Zealand.   When Brassey's term of office concluded in 1900, he sailed Sunbeam back to Britain - again via the Cape.

Thomas Brassey sailed Sunbeam to Quebec in 1903 for a conference and in 1905 took part in a race across the Atlantic for the German Emperor's Ocean Cup; by now in her thirtieth year, Sunbeam managed to come 6th out of the 10 entered. (see also Kaiser's Cup)

In 1907 Brassey made the gift of a model of Sunbeam to the New York Yacht Club; the model is still on show in the club's library.
   
In 1910, Horace Hutchinson, amateur golfer and influential writer on the subject of golf, took Sunbeam on a voyage to Iceland and Canada.  He subsequently wrote a book about the trip titled A Saga of the Sunbeam.  In 1913-14 Thomas Brassey took Sunbeam to India in what he described as the last cruise in his personal service.
  
At the start of WW1, Sunbeam was used for Red Cross work between Britain and France, before being converted to a hospital ship in 1915.  Brassey sailed her to Mudros Bay to support the troops fighting in the Dardanelles, but it soon became obvious that she was of limited value.  Brassey agreed to hand Sunbeam over to the Indian Government for the remainder of the war.  At the time of the handover he estimated that Sunbeam had travelled 500,000 miles since she had been launched.

Brassey died in 1918 and Sunbeam passed to Henry Leonard Brassey before becoming a training ship in 1920.  She was never used in this role and was sold to Sir Walter Runciman in 1922.  He eventually sold her to Thomas Ward Ltd of Morecambe to be broken up, but not before he had commissioned a replacement yacht called Sunbeam II.

References

Ships built in England
1874 ships
Schooners